This is a full list of ice hockey players who have played for the Montreal Canadiens in the National Hockey League (NHL). It includes players that have played at least one regular season or playoff game for the Montreal Canadiens since the team joined the NHL in 1917. Founded in 1909 as one of the founding members of the National Hockey Association (NHA), the Montreal Canadiens were also one of the founding members of the NHL.

As of May 5, 2019, 83 goaltenders and 777 skaters (forwards and defencemen) have appeared in at least one regular-season and/or playoff game with the Montreal Canadiens since the formation of the league in the 1917–18 NHL season. The 709 all-time members of the Canadiens are listed below, with statistics complete through the end of the 2013–14 NHL season. This list does not include members of the Montreal Canadiens while the team was a member of the NHA from 1909 until 1917.

The "Seasons" column lists the first year of the season of the player's first game and the last year of the season of the player's last game. For example, a player who played one game in the 2000–01 season would be listed as playing with the team from 2000–2001, regardless of what calendar year the game occurred within.

Key

Goaltenders

Note: Stats are updated through to the end of the 2021–22 season

Skaters

Note: Stats are updated through to the end of the 2021–2022 season.

Notes

References
Montreal Canadiens all-time roster on the Internet Hockey Database
Montreal Canadiens all-time roster at Legends of Hockey
Montreal Canadiens all-time roster at the Montreal Canadiens Official Site

Montreal Canadiens players
players